Jack McGrath ( – ?) was an American college football player and coach. He served as the head football coach at the University of Louisville in 1931, compiling a record of 0–8. McGrath played college football at the University of Notre Dame under head coach Knute Rockne.

Head coaching record

References

Year of birth missing
Year of death missing
1900s births
American football fullbacks
American football tackles
Louisville Cardinals football coaches
Notre Dame Fighting Irish football players